The Primetime Emmy Award for Outstanding Production Design for a Narrative Period or Fantasy Program (One Hour or More) is an award handed out annually at the Creative Arts Emmy Awards.

In 2014, the category was created alongside Outstanding Production Design for a Narrative Program (Half-Hour or Less) and Outstanding Production Design for a Narrative Contemporary Program (One Hour or More). From 2014 to 2017, contemporary and fantasy programs competed together. Fantasy programs compete alongside period programs since 2018.

Winners and Nominees

2010s

2020s

Programs with multiple awards
Totals combined with Outstanding Art Direction for a Single-Camera Series.

5 awards
 Game of Thrones
 Boardwalk Empire

2 awards
 The Crown

Programs with multiple nominations
Totals combined with Outstanding Art Direction for a Single-Camera Series.

8 nominations
 Game of Thrones

7 nominations
 Mad Men

5 nominations
 Boardwalk Empire
 Downton Abbey

4 nominations
 The Crown
 The Marvelous Mrs. Maisel
 Masters of Sex
 Westworld

2 nominations
 The Knick
 The Man in the High Castle
 The Mandalorian 
 Penny Dreadful
 Stranger Things

Notes

References

Art Direction for a Period Series, Miniseries or a Movie (Single-Camera)